Petro Mykolayovych Symonenko (born 1 August 1952) is a Ukrainian politician and the First Secretary of the Central Committee of the Communist Party of Ukraine. Symonenko was the Communist Party's candidate in the 1999 and 2004, 2010 and until his withdrawal, the 2014 presidential election. The Central Election Commission of Ukraine prohibited his candidacy for the 2019 Ukrainian presidential election due to the fact that the statute, name and symbolism of the Communist Party of Ukraine did not comply with 2015 decommunization laws.

Biography

Symonenko was born in Donetsk. He became a member of the Communist Party of the Soviet Union in 1978, and worked as a party functionary in the 1980s. He has been the First Secretary of the Central Committee of the Communist Party of Ukraine since 1993. He is also the Chairman of the Communist Party Faction in the Verkhovna Rada (parliament).

Symonenko has been a Ukrainian delegate to the Parliamentary Assembly of the Council of Europe. From 1994 to 1996 he was a member of the Ukrainian parliament's Constitution Commission.

He was a candidate in the 1999 Ukrainian presidential election, receiving 22.24% of the votes in the first round and taking second place. In the second round he won 37.8% of the votes, losing to Leonid Kuchma. His election program had classic communist content.

In late 2002 Viktor Yushchenko (Our Ukraine), Oleksandr Moroz (Socialist Party of Ukraine), Yulia Tymoshenko (Yulia Tymoshenko Bloc) and Symonenko issued a joint statement concerning "the beginning of a state revolution in Ukraine". The communist left the alliance, Symonenko was against a single candidate from the alliance in the Ukrainian presidential election 2004, but the other three parties remained allies (until July 2006).

Symonenko's support sharply declined at the time of the 2004 presidential election. Symonenko received 5% of the votes and came in fourth place, unable to get into the controversial runoff which caused the Orange Revolution.

Symonenko was re-elected to the Verkhovna Rada in the September 2007 parliamentary election. At the opening of the new parliament's first session on 23 November 2007, he was re-elected as Chairman of the Communist Party faction.

During the 2010 presidential election he was the candidate of the Bloc of Left and Center-left Forces, receiving 3.54% of the votes.

In 2012 Ukrainian parliamentary election, he was re-elected into the Verkhovna Rada.

In the 2014 Ukrainian presidential election initially he ran as a candidate of his party on a federalization-platform that should have eventually led to a "parliamentary system without the institution of the presidency at all". But he withdrew from the race on 16 May. He stated he withdrew "to save Ukraine from arbitrariness, which takes place today" and said about the elections itself "in our opinion they will be illegitimate". Later the same day, Symonenko's car was attacked by a mob with baseball bats and Molotov cocktails as he left a TV interview. He was uninjured in the incident. In the 2014 Ukrainian presidential election he received 1.51% of the vote.

The Central Election Commission of Ukraine did not register his candidacy for the 2019 Ukrainian presidential election due to the fact that the statute, name and symbolism of the Communist Party of Ukraine did not comply with 2015 decommunization laws.

In late May 2021, TV channel 112 Ukraine received a fine of ₴100,000 for broadcasting Symonenko's claim that the War in Donbas was a "civil war" initiated by "Ukrainian nationalists and neo-fascists supported by the United States."

During the 2022 Russian invasion of Ukraine, he has (as reports Obozrevatel) taken a pro-Russian stance. In March 2022 Symonenko managed to escape from Kyiv to Belarus during the Kyiv offensive with the assistance of Russian forces, according to the Ukrainian internet newspaper Obozrevatel.

Political Positions

On 28 November 2006, the Verkhovna Rada (Ukrainian Parliament) narrowly passed a law defining the Holodomor as a deliberate act of genocide and made public denial illegal. Commenting in 2007, Symonenko said he "does not believe there was any deliberate starvation at all," and accused President Viktor Yushchenko of "using the famine to stir up hatred."  In response, Yushchenko declared he wants "a new law criminalising Holodomor denial."

In May 2012, Symonenko defended the deportation of the Crimean Tatars, saying that this measure saved Crimean Tatars, because otherwise a civil war would have started.

Notes

References

1952 births
Living people
Politicians from Donetsk
Communist Party of Ukraine politicians
Communist Party of Ukraine (Soviet Union) politicians
Second convocation members of the Verkhovna Rada
Third convocation members of the Verkhovna Rada
Fourth convocation members of the Verkhovna Rada
Fifth convocation members of the Verkhovna Rada
Sixth convocation members of the Verkhovna Rada
Seventh convocation members of the Verkhovna Rada
Candidates in the 1999 Ukrainian presidential election
Candidates in the 2004 Ukrainian presidential election
Candidates in the 2010 Ukrainian presidential election
Candidates in the 2014 Ukrainian presidential election
People of the 2014 pro-Russian unrest in Ukraine